Maral Artin (born 9 June 2000) is an Armenian footballer who plays as a forward for Cordoba Féminin and the Armenia national team.

Born in Germany, she became B-Juniorinnen Bundesliga champion with Bayern Munich during her youth career.

International career
Artin was capped for Armenia at senior level in two friendlies against Lithuania on 4 and 6 March 2020, and scored her first goal in her second appearance.

International goals

See also
List of Armenia women's international footballers

References

External links
 
 Maral Artin at Soccerdonna

2000 births
Living people
Citizens of Armenia through descent
German people of Armenian descent
Sportspeople from Heidelberg
Armenian women's footballers
German women's footballers
German expatriate women's footballers
Footballers from Baden-Württemberg
Women's association football forwards
Armenia women's international footballers
FC Alashkert players
TSG 1899 Hoffenheim (women) players
2. Frauen-Bundesliga players
FC Bayern Munich (women) players
1. FFC Frankfurt players
Armenian expatriate footballers
Armenian expatriate sportspeople in France
Expatriate women's footballers in France
German expatriate sportspeople in France
Armenian expatriate sportspeople in Spain
German expatriate sportspeople in Spain
Expatriate women's footballers in Spain
Primera Federación (women) players

Armenia international footballers
Association football forwards